Hoseynabad-e Amiri may refer to:

Hoseynabad-e Amiri, Lorestan